Sipho Mumbi (born February 20, 1983) is a Zambian retired footballer midfielder who last played for NAPSA Stars in the Zambian Premier League.

Club career
Born and raised in Zambia, Mumbi started his career at local club Tazara Express in Kapiri Mposhi before relocating to the United States, playing college soccer for Stratford Academy. After two years he returned to Zambia, joining Zanaco and winning the Zambian Premier League title in his second season with the club. Mumbi helped his team to win the Zambian Charity Shield as well as the Zambian Coca-Cola Cup a year later, earning his first caps for the Zambian national team in the process.

In 2005, Mumbi returned to the United States to compete in the USL Premier Development League playing for Ajax Orlando Prospects, the farm team of Dutch club Ajax Amsterdam. He made five league appearances while scoring twice in one season with Ajax, before returning to Zambia and joining Lusaka Dynamos. Playing in the Zambian Premier League once more, Mumbi remained with the Dynamos for one season, before joining crosstown rivals City of Lusaka.

In 2008, Mumbi joined Petro do Huambo competing in the Girabola, the top flight of football in Angola. After one season he returned to Zambia, playing for Zamsure for six months. He then joined Dolo Mando in India for six months, before returning to Angola to join Progresso.

In 2012, Mumbi joined NAPSA Stars in Zambia, competing in the CAF Champions League, and helping his team to win the 2012 Barclays Cup.

International career
Mumbi has played for Zambia at various youth levels. He has also played for the senior team on several occasions, playing in the Africa Cup of Nations qualifying matches against Botswana and Rwanda.

Honours

Club
Zanaco
Zambian Premier League: 2003
Zambian Coca-Cola Cup: 2004
Zambian Charity Shield: 2003

NAPSA Stars
Barclays Cup: 2012

References

1979 births
Living people
Association football midfielders
Zambian footballers
Zambia international footballers
Expatriate soccer players in the United States
Expatriate footballers in Angola
Expatriate footballers in India
Zambian expatriate sportspeople in Angola
Zambian expatriate sportspeople in India
Zambian expatriate sportspeople in the United States
Ajax Orlando Prospects players
Académica Petróleos do Lobito players
Atlético Petróleos do Huambo players
Atlético Petróleos do Namibe players
Lusaka Dynamos F.C. players
Progresso Associação do Sambizanga players
Zanaco F.C. players
NAPSA Stars F.C. players
Zamsure F.C. players
USL League Two players